Newton County is a county located in the U.S. state of Mississippi. As of the 2020 census, the population was 21,291. Its county seat is Decatur.

History
Newton County was formed in 1836 and named after scientist Isaac Newton.

The Battle of Newton's Station was fought in the county on April 24, 1863, during Grierson's Raid of the American Civil War. 

In February 1864, General William Tecumseh Sherman crossed the county, burning the county seat at Decatur and was nearly captured during the Meridian Campaign. Sherman stopped during the return trip from Meridian and slept in the town of Union.

On October 8, 1908, a black sharecropper named Shep Jones had a disagreement with his white employer, leading to the employer's death.  While searching for Jones, a white mob destroyed property owned by black people, burned their church and meeting lodge, threatened black families, and hanged Jones' father-in-law and two other black men.  Many black people fled Newton County. No arrests or restitution occurred.

Geography

Major highways
  Interstate 20
  U.S. Highway 80
  Mississippi Highway 15

Adjacent counties
 Neshoba County (north)
 Lauderdale County (east)
 Jasper County (south)
 Scott County (west)

National protected area
 Bienville National Forest (part)

Demographics

2020 census

As of the 2020 United States Census, there were 21,291 people, 8,037 households, and 5,697 families residing in the county.

2000 census
As of the census of 2000, there were 21,838 people, 8,221 households, and 6,001 families residing in the county. The population density was 38 people per square mile (15/km2). There were 9,259 housing units at an average density of 16 per square mile (6/km2). The racial makeup of the county was 65.01% white, 30.37% black or African American, 3.68% Native American, 0.18% Asian, 0.33% from other races, and 0.44% from two or more races. 0.91% of the population were Hispanic or Latino of any race.

There were 8,221 households, out of which 33.50% had children under the age of 18 living with them, 53.00% were married couples living together, 16.00% had a female householder with no husband present, and 27.00% were non-families. 24.60% of all households were made up of individuals, and 11.60% had someone living alone who was 65 years of age or older. The average household size was 2.57 and the average family size was 3.04.

In the county, the population was spread out, with 26.20% under the age of 18, 11.20% from 18 to 24, 26.00% from 25 to 44, 21.70% from 45 to 64, and 14.90% who were 65 years of age or older. The median age was 35 years. For every 100 females there were 92.40 males. For every 100 females age 18 and over, there were 88.70 males.

The median income for a household in the county was $28,735, and the median income for a family was $34,606. Males had a median income of $27,820 versus $20,757 for females. The per capita income for the county was $14,008. About 16.40% of families and 19.90% of the population were below the poverty line, including 26.30% of those under age 18 and 21.70% of those age 65 or over.

Communities

City
 Newton

Towns
 Chunky
 Decatur (county seat)
 Hickory
 Lake (mostly in Scott County)
 Union (partly in Neshoba County)

Census-designated place
 Conehatta

Unincorporated communities
 Battlefield
Cedar Grove
 Duffee
 Lawrence 
 Little Rock
Perdue
 Stratton

Ghost towns
 Volcan

Politics

Education
School districts include:
 Newton County School District
 Newton Municipal School District
 Union Public School District

Conehatta Elementary School of the Choctaw Tribal School System is in the community.

See also
 Dry counties
 National Register of Historic Places listings in Newton County, Mississippi

References

Further reading
 A.J. Brown, History of Newton County, Mississippi from 1834 to 1894. Jackson, MS: Clarion-Ledger Co., 1894. • HTML version
 Nicholas Russell Murray, Newton County, Mississippi, 1872-1900. Hammond, LA: Hunting for Bears, 1981.
 Newton County Pictorial History Committee, Newton County, Mississippi: A Pictorial History. Humboldt, TN: Rose Publishing Co., 2000.

 
1836 establishments in Mississippi
Mississippi counties
Populated places established in 1836